Aida Molinos (born 14 September 1941) is a Filipino sprinter. She competed in the women's 4 × 100 metres relay at the 1964 Summer Olympics.

References

1941 births
Living people
Athletes (track and field) at the 1964 Summer Olympics
Filipino female sprinters
Olympic track and field athletes of the Philippines
Place of birth missing (living people)
Asian Games medalists in athletics (track and field)
Asian Games gold medalists for the Philippines
Athletes (track and field) at the 1962 Asian Games
Medalists at the 1962 Asian Games
Olympic female sprinters